Südmüritz is a municipality in the Mecklenburgische Seenplatte district, in Mecklenburg-Vorpommern, Germany. It was created with effect from 26 May 2019 by the merger of the former municipalities of Ludorf and Vipperow. Its name refers to its location on the south side of the lake Müritz.

References

Mecklenburgische Seenplatte (district)